The 1992 Landers earthquake occurred on Sunday, June 28 with an epicenter near the town of Landers, California, in San Bernardino County. The shock had a moment magnitude of 7.3 and a maximum Mercalli intensity of IX (Violent).

Earthquake
At 4:57 a.m. local time (11:57 UTC) on June 28, 1992, a magnitude 7.3 earthquake awoke much of Southern California. Though it turned out it was not the so-called "Big One" as many people would think, it was still a very strong earthquake. The shaking lasted for two to three minutes. Although this earthquake was much more powerful than the 1994 Northridge earthquake, the damage and loss of life were minimized by its location in the sparsely-populated Mojave Desert.

The names of those that were involved are the Johnson Valley, Kickapoo (also known as Landers), Homestead Valley, Homestead/Emerson, Emerson Valley and Camp Rock faults.

Damage
Damage to the area directly surrounding the epicenter was severe. Roads were buckled. Buildings and chimneys collapsed. There were also large surface fissures. To the west in the Los Angeles Basin damage was much less severe. The majority of the damage in the Los Angeles area involved items that had fallen off shelves. Unlike the 1994 Northridge earthquake nineteen and a half months later, no freeway bridges collapsed because of the epicenter's remote location. Electricity was cut to thousands of residents but was generally restored within two to three hours. There was also some damage to homes from water displaced from swimming pools.

Loss of life in this earthquake was minimal. Two people died as a result of heart attacks, and a 3-year-old boy from Massachusetts, who was visiting Yucca Valley with his parents, died when bricks from a chimney collapsed into a living room where he was sleeping.  More than 400 people sustained injuries as a result of the earthquake.

Related events

The quake was preceded by the 6.1 magnitude Joshua Tree earthquake at 4:51 on April 23, 1992 (UTC), which was south of the future Landers epicenter. The 6.5 magnitude Big Bear earthquake, which hit about three hours after the Landers mainshock, was originally considered an aftershock. However, the United States Geological Survey determined that this was a separate, but related, earthquake. These two earthquakes are considered a regional earthquake sequence, rather than a main shock and aftershock.

The magnitude 5.7 Little Skull Mountain (LSM) earthquake the following day, June 29, 1992, at 10:14 UTC near Yucca Mountain, Nevada, is also considered part of the regional sequence and may have been triggered by surface wave energy produced by the Landers earthquake. Foreshock activity, in the form of a significant increase in micro-earthquakes, was observed at Little Skull Mountain following the Landers earthquake, and the activity continued until the main LSM earthquake.

Theories
The Landers earthquake and the other large quakes associated with it in the Mojave region have been attributed to two possible long-term trends.  One of these is that the San Andreas Fault may be in the process of being replaced as the plate boundary (between the North American Plate and the Pacific Plate) by a new trend across the Mojave and east of the Sierra Nevada Mountains.  The other is that these quakes were a manifestation of the propagation of rifting coming up from the Gulf of California.

In popular culture
The earthquake is featured in the television documentary series produced by GRB Entertainment, aired on The Learning Channel and other television channels around the world, about natural disasters titled Earth's Fury (also known internationally as Anatomy of Disaster) in an episode entitled "Earthquake!"

See also

 List of earthquakes in California
 List of earthquakes in the United States
 1999 Hector Mine earthquake
 2010 Baja California earthquake
 2019 Ridgecrest earthquakes

References

Further reading

External links 
 Landers Earthquake at the Southern California Earthquake Data Center
 Big Bear Earthquake at the Southern California Earthquake Data Center
 Studying the M7.3 1992 Landers, California earthquake: original forms and initial modifications – Ramon Arrowsmith
 

1992
1992 earthquakes
Strike-slip earthquakes
1992 in California
History of the Mojave Desert region
Geology of San Bernardino County, California
History of San Bernardino County, California